A bunting is any festive decorations made of fabric, or of plastic, paper or cardboard in imitation of fabric. Typical forms of buntings are strings of colorful, monochrome, beige triangular flags and lengths of fabric in the colors of national flags gathered and draped into swags or pleated into fan shapes.

History
Bunting was originally a specific type of lightweight worsted wool fabric generically known as tammy, manufactured from the turn of the 17th century, and used for making ribbons and flags, including signal flags for the Royal Navy. Amongst other properties that made the fabric suitable for ribbons and flags was its high glaze, achieved by a process including hot-pressing.

The origin of the word is uncertain, but bunt means colourful in German. 

The term bunting is also used to refer to a collection of flags, and particularly those of a ship. The officer responsible for raising signals using flags is known as bunts, a term still used for a ship's communications officer.

Bunting is a popular choice of decoration at parties, weddings and within gardens.

See also
Papel picado

Notes

References

External links 
 

Woven fabrics